Rejala is a surname. Notable people with the surname include:

 Gabriela Rejala (born 1989), Paraguayan beauty pageant contestant
 Julián Rejala (1907–1981), Paraguayan musician